Moose and JRock (Hugh Evans and James Espley) are two broadcasters based in Surrey and Manchester, who present the Saturday 3-5pm show on Primordial Radio.

Prior to that the dynamic duo partnered on the Breakfast Show on Team Rock Radio 
 The programme aired weekdays, 7am to 11am, with the exception of Friday where they broadcast four hours of requests.

Evans is now CEO at Primordial Radio, whilst Espley, is a Production Manager at Bauer. Previously, they have both worked together at Team Rock Radio and prior to that Real Radio XS, formerly 106.1 Rock Radio based in Manchester.

The duo once broadcast their entire show whilst travelling from Southwark tube station in Central London, to Stratford in East London using just the wifi provided by Virgin Media at each station. The journey culminated in a McDonald's breakfast at the end of the programme. In 2015 the duo raised £348 in crowdfunding to sell cowbells at the Download Festival, as "an ideal way to frustrate your campsite neighbours at 5am".

References

Internet radio in the United Kingdom
British radio people